Ouled Bouachra is a town and commune in Médéa Province, Algeria.

References

Communes of Médéa Province
Cities in Algeria
Algeria